Mike Grocott is professor of anaesthesia and critical care medicine at the University of Southampton and director of the National Institute for Health and Care Research's (NIHR) Southampton Biomedical Research Centre (2022-27). He is an NIHR Senior Investigator (2018-26)  and was national specialty group lead for Anaesthesia Perioperative Medicine and Pain within the NIHR Clinical Research Network (2015-2021). He is a consultant in critical care medicine at University Hospital Southampton NHS Foundation Trust.

Grocott is an elected council member of the Royal College of Anaesthetists and served as vice-president (2019–20). He founded the national Centre for Perioperative Care (CPOC)  and is currently vice-chair of the CPOC board.

He has served as the chair of the board of the National Institute of Academic Anaesthesia (NIAA) since 2018 and was previously the founding director of the NIAA Health Services Research Centre at the Royal College of Anaesthetists (2011-2016) and founding chair of the HQIP funded National Emergency Laparotomy Audit (2012-2017).

In 2007 Grocott summited Everest as leader of the Caudwell Xtreme Everest medical research expedition  and is the founding chair of the Xtreme Everest Oxygen Research Consortium.

He lives in the New Forest with his wife, Professor Denny Levett, three children and a "working" Cocker Spaniel.

References

External links 
PubMedAuthorSearch| Grocott M
Google Scholar Citations| Mike Grocott

Living people
Year of birth missing (living people)
Fellows of the Royal College of Anaesthetists
Fellows of the Royal College of Physicians
Academics of the University of Southampton
British anaesthetists
Alumni of St George's, University of London